Events from the year 1581 in the Kingdom of Scotland.

Incumbents
Monarch – James VI

Births
Thomas Sydserf, a merchant

Deaths
James Douglas, 4th Earl of Morton executed
James Stuart, 3rd Earl of Moray

See also
 Timeline of Scottish history

References

 
Years of the 16th century in Scotland